The 2020 Southern Conference women's basketball tournament was held between March 5–8, 2020, at the Harrah's Cherokee Center in Asheville, North Carolina. Samford won the tournament and received an automatic bid to the 2020 NCAA Tournament.

Seeds
Teams are seeded by record within the conference, with a tiebreaker system to seed teams with identical conference records.

Schedule
All tournament games are streamed on  ESPN+. The championship was televised across the region on select Nexstar stations and simulcast on ESPN+.

Bracket
 All times are Eastern.

See also
2020 Southern Conference men's basketball tournament

References

2019–20 Southern Conference women's basketball season
SoCon women's
College basketball tournaments in North Carolina
SoCon women's
Southern Conference women's basketball tournament
Southern Conference women's basketball tournament